Evius hippia is a moth of the family Erebidae. It was described by Caspar Stoll in 1790. It is found in Mexico, Panama, Trinidad, French Guiana, Colombia, Suriname, Venezuela and Brazil.

References

Phaegopterina
Moths described in 1790